Jared is a given name of Biblical derivation.

Origin
In the Book of Genesis, the biblical patriarch Jared (יֶרֶד) was the sixth in the ten pre-flood generations between Adam and Noah; he was the son of Mahalaleel and the father of Enoch, and lived 962 years (Genesis 5:18).
The biblical text in the Book of Jubilees  implicitly etymologizes the name as derived from the root YRD "descend", because in his days "the angels of the Lord descended to earth". Alternative suggestions for the name's etymology include words for "rose", "servant" and "one who rules".

Yared (505–571), a namesake, was an Ethiopian monk who introduced the concept of sacred music to Ethiopian Orthodox services. He is regarded as a saint of the Ethiopian Orthodox Church with a feast day of 11 Genbot (May 19).

In some English-speaking countries, Jared is both a common Jewish and Christian-Protestant first name.

People

Arts, entertainment, and media

 Jared Abrahamson (born 1987), Canadian actor
 Jared Allman (born 1984), American actor
 Jared Anderson (Christian musician) (born 1979), American musician and Christian worship leader
 Jared Anderson (heavy metal musician) (1974–2006), American musician
 Jared Angira (born 1947), Kenyan poet and author
 Jared Angle, American ballet dancer
 Jared Artaud, American musician
 Jared Maurice Arter (1850–1930), American author and former slave
 Jared Ball (born 1971), American author and radio host
 Jared "Drake" Bell (born 1986), American actor and singer
 Jared Blake (born 1978), American musician and actor
 Jared Bowen, American journalist and reporter
 Jared Breeze (born 2005), American child actor
Jared Bush (born 1974), American screenwriter and television producer
 Jared Byers, American musician
 Jared Carter (born 1939), American author and editor
 Jared Campbell (born 1989), American stand-up comedian and former football player
 Jared Cohn, American film director, screenwriter, and actor
 Jared Cohon (born 1947), American author, editor, engineer
 Jared Cole, American physicist
 Jared Colinger, American musician
 Jared Cotter (born 1981), American musician
 Jared Curtis (born 1936), American author and editor
 Jared Daperis (born 1990), Australian actor
 Jared DePasquale (born 1971), American film, television, and audio drama composer
 Jared Diamond (born 1937), American scientist and author
 Jared Dines (born 1989), American musician and YouTuber
 Jared Eliot (1685–1763) American colonial minister, physician and agronomist
 Jared Emerson-Johnson (born 1981), American video game music composer and voice actor
 Jared Evan (born 1989), American musician
 Jared Bradley Flagg (1820–1899), American painter
 Jared Faber, American film, television producer, and musician
 Jared Falk (born 1981), Canadian musician
 Jared Farmer (born 1974), American historian and author
 Jared Fogle (born 1977), American former spokesman for Subway and registered sex offender
 Jared Followill (born 1986), American musician
 Jared French (1905–1988), American painter
 Jared Friedman (born 1984), American entrepreneur and investor
 Jared Gertner, American actor
 Jared Gilman (born 1998), American actor
 Jared Gilmore (born 2000), American actor
 Jared Gold (born 1972), American fashion designer
 Jared Gold (organist), American musician
 Jared Gomes (born 1968), American musician and activist
 Jared Ian Goldman (born 1979), American film and television producer
 Jared Lee Gosselin (born 1981), American record producer
 Jared J. Grantham (1936–2017), American physician, nephrologist, and author
 Jared Gutstadt (born 1977), Canadian-born American music executive
 Jared Hampton (born 1990), American musician
 Jared Harris (born 1961), British actor
 Jared Hartmann (born 1985), American musician
 Jared Hasselhoff (born 1971), American musician and actor
 Jared Hauser (born 1971), American musician and professor
 Jared Hecht (born 1987), American entrepreneur
 Jared Hedges (born 1980), American screenwriter, television producer, and video games
 Jared Hess (born 1979), American filmmaker
 Jared Heyman, American entrepreneur
 Jared Isaacman (born 1983), American businessman
 Jared Israel (born 1944), American writer, activist, and conspiracy theorist
 Jared Jussim (born 1935), American lawyer, actor and former executive vice president at Sony Pictures
 Jared Keeso (born 1984), Canadian actor
 Jared Kuemper, Canadian musician, record producer, and audio engineer
 Jared Kusnitz (born 1988), American actor
 Jared Lane (born 1972), New Zealand artist and illustrator
 Jared Lee (born 1943), Canadian artist and cartoonist
 Jared Lehr, American jewelry fashion designer
 Jared Leto (born 1971), American actor and musician
 Jared Louche (born 1960), American musician
 Jared MacEachern (born 1980), American musician
 Jared Marston, Australian musician and DJ producer
 Jared Martin (1940–2017), American actor
 Jared McCloud (born 1980), American musician
 Jared Mezzocchi (born 1985), American theatre projection designer and director
 Jared Mitchell (writer) (born 1955), Canadian journalist and author
 Jared Morgenstern (born 1981), American designer and entrepreneur
 Jared Moshe, American film director, screenwriter, and producer
 Jared Murillo (born 1988), American dancer, singer, and actor
 Jared Nathan (1985–2006), American child actor
 Jared James Nichols (born 1989), American musician
 Jared Nissim (born 1973), American businessman
 Jared Overton, American musician
 Jared Padalecki (born 1982), American actor
 Jared Palomar, American musician
 Jared Pappas-Kelly (born 1974), American curator, author, and visual artist
 Jared Paul, American Talent manager and producer
 Jared Pelletier (born 1990), Canadian director
 Jared Poythress (born 1985), Japanese-born American music producer and DJ
 Jared Purton (1976–2009), Australian-born immunologist
 Jared Rigsby, American musician
 Jared Robinsen (born 1963), Australian actor
 Jared Rushton (born 1974), American musician and actor
 Jared Safier (born 1982), American television and film producer
 Jared Yates Sexton (born 1981), American author and political commentator
 Jared Shavelson, American musician
 Jared Slingerland (born 1984), Canadian musician
 Jared Sorensen, indie role-playing game designer
 Jared Southwick, (1976–2011), American musician
 Jared Spears (born 1936), American musician
 Jared Spool (born 1960), American Author, public speaker, and consultant
 Jared Paul Stern (born 1971), American journalist, photographer, and designer
 Jared Stern, American screenwriter
 Jared Swilley (born 1983), American musician
 Jared Taylor (born 1951), American white supremacist and author
 Jared Thomas (born 1976), Australian author
 Jared Tinklenberg, American psychiatrist and author
 Jared Sidney Torrance (1853–1921), American businessman and real estate developer
 Jared Turner (born 1978), New Zealand-born Australian actor
 Jared Tyler (born 1978), American musician
 Jared Van Snellenberg (born 1980), Canadian actor
 Jared Wade (born 1989), American musician
 Jared Warren, American musician
 Jared Warth (born 1986), American musician
 Jared Bell Waterbury (1799–1876), American minister and author
 Jared Yates, (American Idol) contestant

Government and politics

 Jared Benson (1821–1894), American politician
 Jared Bernstein (born 1955), American economist, author, and advisor at the Center on Budget and Policy Priorities
 Jared Brossett (born 1982), American politician
 Jared M. Brush (1814–1895), American politician, 28th Mayor of Pittsburgh PA
 Jared Cohen (born 1981), American businessman, author, and advisor at the Council on Foreign Relations
 Jared Genser, international human rights lawyer, author, and advisor at the Raoul Wallenberg Centre for Human Rights
 Jared Golden (born 1982), American politician
 Jared Comstock Gregory (1823–1892), American politician, 12th Mayor of Madison WI
 Jared Hegwood, American author and writer for the United States Naval Oceanographic Office
 Jared Henderson, American politician
 Jared Huffman (born 1964), American politician
 Jared Ingersol Chipman (1788–1832), Nova Scotian lawyer and politician
 Jared Ingersoll (1749–1822), American politician
 Jared Ingersoll Sr. (1722–1781) American stamp act agent
 Jared Irwin (1750–1818), American politician, 22nd Governor of Georgia
 Jared Irwin (Pennsylvania politician) (1768–1818), American politician and zoologist
 Jared Potter Kirtland (1793–1877), American politician
 Jared Kushner (born 1981), American businessman and senior advisor to President Donald Trump
 Jared Maddux (1911–1971), American politician
 Jared Mansfield (1759–1830), American mathematician, Professor at the United States Military Academy and Surveyor General of the Northwest Territory
 Jared Mead (born 1991), American politician
 Jared Moskowitz (born 1980), American politician
 Jared Nunes (born 1982), American politician
 Jared Olsen (born 1987), American politician
 Jared O'Mara (born 1981), former British politician
 Jared Patterson, American politician
 Jared Paul Stratton, American politician
 Jared V. Peck (1816–1891), American politician
 Jared Perkins (1793–1854), American politician
 Jared Polis (born 1975), American politician, 43rd Governor of Colorado
 Jared Y. Sanders Jr. (1892–1960), American lawyer and politician
 Jared Y. Sanders Sr. (1869–1944), American politician
 Jared Solomon (born 1978), American politician
 Jared Solomon (Maryland politician), American politician
 Jared Sparks (1789–1866), American historian and politician
 Jared Thompson Jr. (1836–1914), American lawyer and politician
 Jared C. Troop (1837–1876), Canadian lawyer and politician
 Jared Weinstein (born 1979), former government official and personal aide to the 43rd President of the United States
 Jared Whitaker (1818–1884), American newspaperman and politician 
 Jared W. Williams (1796–1864), American lawyer and politician
 Jared Williams (Virginia politician) (1766–1831), American politician
 Jared Woodfill (born 1968), American lawyer and politician
 Jared Wright, American newspaper editor and former politician

Sports

 Jared Abbrederis (born 1990), American football player
 Jared Allen (born 1982), American football player
 Jared Allen (quarterback) (born 1981), American football coach and former player
 Jared Anderson (boxer) (born 1999), American boxer
 Jared Aulin (born 1982), Canadian ice hockey player
 Jared Barker (born 1975), Canadian rugby union player
 Jared Bednar (born 1972), Canadian ice hockey coach and former player
 Jared Benko, American athletic director
 Jared Berggren (born 1990), American basketball player
 Jared Bird (born 1997), English football player
 Jared Bidwell (born 1987), Australian rower
 Jared Boll (born 1986), American ice hockey player
 Jared Borgetti (born 1973), Mexican football player
 Jared Brennan (born 1984), Australian rules football player
 Jared Brown (born 1973), American football player
 Jared Brownridge (born 1994), American basketball player
 Jared Burton (born 1981), American baseball player
 Jared Butler (born 2000), American basketball player
 Jared Cannonier (born 1984), American mixed martial artist 
 Jared Clauss (born 1981), American football player
 Jared Connaughton (born 1985), Canadian sprinter
 Jared Cook (born 1987), American football player
 Jared Coreau (born 1991), Canadian ice hockey player
 Jared Cowen (born 1991), Canadian ice hockey player
 Jared Crick (born 1989), American football player
 Jared Crouch (born 1978), Australian rules football player
 Jared Cunningham (born 1991), American basketball player
 Jared Curtis (footballer) (born 1979), Samoan football player
 Jared Deacon (born 1975), British sprinter
 Jared DeMichiel (born 1985), American ice hockey coach and former player
 Jared DeVries (born 1976), American football player
 Jared Dillinger (born 1984), Filipino-American basketball player
 Jared Donaldson (born 1996), American tennis player
 Jared Downing (born 1989), American mixed martial artist
 Jared Dudley (born 1985), American basketball player
 Jared Elliott, American football coach
 Jared Embick (born 1978), American soccer coach and former player
 Jared Fernández (born 1972), American baseball player
 Jared Frayer (born 1978), American wrestler
 Jared Gaither (born 1986), American football player
 Jared Garcia (born 1982) American BMX rider
 Jared Goff (born 1994), American football player
 Jared Goldberg (born 1991), American alpine skier
 Jared Gomes (ice hockey) (born 1988), Canadian ice hockey player
 Jared Gordon (born 1988), American mixed martial artist
 Jared Grasso (born 1980), American basketball coach and former player
 Jared Graves (born 1982), Australian cyclist
 Jared Green (born 1989), American football player
 Jared Hamman (born 1982), American martial artist
 Jared Harper (born 1997), American basketball player
 Jared Hassin (born 1989), American football player
 Jared Heine (born 1984), Marshallese swimmer
 Jared Hess (fighter) (born 1983), American mixed martial artist
 Jared Hodgkiss (born 1986), English football player
 Jared Homan (born 1983), American basketball player
 Jared Hoying (born 1989), American baseball player
 Jared Hughes (born 1985), American baseball player
 Jared Jarvis (born 1994), Antigua and Barbuda sprinter
 Jared Jeffrey (born 1990), American soccer player
 Jared Jeffries (born 1981), American basketball player
 Jared Jenkins (born 1989), American football player
 Jared Jordan (born 1984), American basketball player
 Jarred Kelenic (born 1999), American baseball player
 Jared Kelley (born 2001), American baseball player
 Jared Khasa (born 1997), French football player
 Jared Kirby, American fencing instructor and martial artist
 Jared Koenig (born 1994), American baseball player
 Jared Koster (born 1991), Canadian football player
 Jared Lakind (born 1992), American baseball player
 Jared Landers (born 1982), American racing driver
 Jared Lewis (born 1982), Saint Vincent and the Grenadines sprinter
 Jared London (born 1995), Trinidadian and Tobagonians football player
 Jared Lorenzen (1981-2019), American football player
 Jared Lum (born 1992), Australian soccer player
 Jared Mayden (born 1998), American football player
 Jared McCann (born 1996), Canadian ice hockey player
 Jared McGee, American football player
 Jared McGriff-Culver (born 1989), American football player
 Jared Mees (born 1986), American motorcycle racer
 Jared Mitchell (baseball) (born 1988), American baseball player
 Jared Mills (born 1976), New Zealand rugby league player
 Jared Montz (born 1982), American soccer player
 Jared Moon (born 1971), American baseball coach and former player
 Jared Mortensen (born 1988), Canadian baseball player
 Jared Newberry (born 1981), American football player
 Jared Newson (born 1984), American basketball player
 Jared Nickens (born 1994), American basketball player
 Jared Nightingale (born 1982), American ice hockey player
 Jared Norman (born 1974), English cricketer
 Jared Norris (born 1993), American football player
 Jared Odenbeck (born 1995), American soccer player
 Jared Odrick (born 1987), American football player
 Jared Oliva (born 1995), American baseball player
 Jared Page (born 1993), New Zealand rugby union player
 Jared Palmer (born 1971), American tennis player
 Jared Panchia (born 1993), New Zealand field hockey player 
 Jared Payne (born 1985), New Zealand-born Irish rugby union player
 Jared Peniston (born 1982), Bermudian football player
 Jared Perry (born 1988), American football player
 Jared Petrenko (born 1989), Australian rules football player
 Jarred Phillips (born 1995), Canadian soccer player
 Jared Pinkney (born 1997), American football player
 Jared Poché (born 1994), American baseball player
 Jared Polec (born 1992), Australian rules football player
 Jared Poulton (born 1977), Australian rules football player
 Jared Rando (born 1981), Australian mountain biker
 Jared Reiner (born 1982), American basketball player
 Jared Retkofsky (born 1983), American football player
 Jared Rhoden (born 1999), American basketball player
 Jared Rivers (born 1984), Australian rules football player
 Jared Rollins (born 1977), American mixed martial artist
 Jared Rosholt (born 1986), American mixed martial artist
 Jared Ross (born 1982), American ice hockey player
 Jared Rosser (born 1997), Welsh rugby union player
 Jared Sandberg (born 1978), American baseball coach and former player
 Jared Saunders (born 1990), South African rugby union player
 Jared Savage (born 1997), American basketball player
 Jared Schuurmans (born 1987), American discus thrower
 Jared "Skip" Schumaker (born 1980), American baseball player
 Jared Shuster (born 1998), American baseball player
 Jared Simpson (born 1996), English rugby league player
 Jared Sims (born 1993), English football player
 Jared Smith (born 1990), American football player
 Jared Solomon (baseball) (born 1997), American baseball player
 Jared Spurgeon (born 1989), Canadian ice hockey player
 Jared Staal (born 1990), Canadian ice hockey player 
 Jared Stroud (born 1996), American soccer player
 Jared Sullinger (born 1992), American basketball player
 Jared Tallent (born 1984), Australian race walker
 Jared Taylor (rugby league) (born 1981), French rugby league player
 Jared Tebo (born 1987), American radio-controlled car racer
 Jared Terrell (born 1995), American basketball player
 Jared Theodorakos (born 1981), American baseball player
 Jared Timmer (born 1997), American soccer player
 Jared du Toit (born 1995), Canadian golfer
 Jared Tomich (born 1974), American football player
 Jared Veldheer (born 1987), American football player
 Jared Verse, American football player
 Jared Waerea-Hargreaves (born 1989), New Zealand rugby league player
 Jared Walsh (born 1993), American baseball player
 Jared Ward (born 1988), American long-distance runner
 Jared Warner (born 1996), English cricketer
 Jared Watts (born 1992), American soccer player
 Jared Weaver (born 1982), American baseball player
 Jared Wells (born 1981), American baseball player
 Jared Wilson (footballer) (born 1989), English football player
 Jared Wolfe (born 1988), American golfer
 Jared Young (born 1995), Canadian baseball player
 Jared Zabransky (born 1983), American football player
 Jared Zezel (born 1991), American curler

Other people 
 Jared Carter (Latter Day Saints) (1801–1849), early American leader in the Latter Day Saint movement
 Jared Crane, son of American businessman Jim Crane
 Jared Kleinstein, American baseball fan who mimicked baseball player Tim Tebow for kneeling during the U.S. national anthem
 Jared Lee Loughner (born 1988), American criminal who was arrested for the 2011 Tucson shooting
 Jared C. Monti (1975–2006), American soldier who was killed in action during the War in Afghanistan
 Jared Pratt (1769–1839), American and father of the Mormon pioneer brothers
 Jared Remy (born 1978), American criminal who was involved in the assault and murder of Jennifer Martel
 Jared Robinet, American police officer who was involved in the shooting of Stephon Clark

Fictional characters 

 Jared, fictional character from the television show Kids Incorporated (portrayed by Jared Delgin)
 Jared Afeaki, fictional character from television show Shortland Street (portrayed by Beulah Koale)
 Jared Banks, fictional character from television show One Life to Live (portrayed by John Brotherton)
 Jared Casey, fictional character from television show Passions (portrayed by James Stevenson)
 Jared Dunn, fictional character from television show Silicon Valley (portrayed by Zach Woods)
 Jared Garrity, fictional character from television show The Twilight Zone (portrayed by John Dehner)
 Jared Evan Grace, fictional from the movie The Spiderwick Chronicles (portrayed by Freddie Highmore)
 Jared Hall, fictional character from the television show One Life to Live (portrayed by Herve Clermont)
 Jared Haynes, fictional character from the television show Emmerdale (portrayed by Philip Hill-Pearson)
 Jared Kincaid, fictional character from Jim Butcher's novel series The Dresden Files
 Jared Kleinman, fictional character from the Broadway musical Dear Evan Hansen (portrayed by Alex Wyse, Will Roland, Jared Goldsmith, and Jack Loxton)
 Jared Levine, fictional character from the television show All Saints (portrayed by Ben Tari)
 Jared "Munter" Mason, fictional character from the television show Outrageous Fortune (portrayed by Tammy Davis)
 Jared Morillo, fictional character from the DC comic series Rogues
 Jared Morillo (Arrowverse), fictional character from the television show The Flash (portrayed by Stephen Huszar)
 Jared Nomak, fictional character from the movie Blade 2 (portrayed by Luke Goss)
 Jared Vasquez, fictional character from Manifest (portrayed by J. R. Ramirez)
 Jared Bakravan, fictional character from James Clavell's novel Whirlwind
 Jared Vance (portrayed by Akinsola Arimbo), son of fictional character Leon Vance from the television show NCIS

References

English masculine given names
Given names
Jewish given names
Modern names of Hebrew origin